Clonmel Commercials GFC is a Gaelic Athletic Association Gaelic football club located in the town of Clonmel in County Tipperary, Ireland. The club is part of the South Division of Tipperary GAA. They have been Tipperary Senior Football champions on twenty occasions since their formation in 1934.

History
Affiliated to the GAA in 1934, the club's first taste of county success came in the form of a minor title in 1935. A County Junior title followed in 1940, before the first of the club's 15 Senior titles in 1944. Arguably the club's greatest achievement was winning three county titles in a row in 1965, 1966 and 1967. The captain on all three teams was Brian O'Callaghan. The club's two county titles of the nineties came in 1990 and 1994. On both these occasions Commercials were beaten in the Munster Senior Club Final. 1994 was the club's fourth appearance in the provincial final where they were beaten by Castlehaven. In 1990 they came closest to winning the title only to lose out after a replay and extra time to Dr. Crokes. In 2002, Commercials won their first County title of the new Millennium by defeating Aherlow in Semple Stadium and won their 15th overall in 2012 by defeating the 2011 champions, Thomas MacDonagh's, at Semple Stadium on 5 November by 1–9 to 0-5 Colman Kennedy scored the decisive 2nd half goal in a man-of-the-match performance, redolent of his displays as a minor for Tipperary at All-Ireland level. This victory amply avenged the defeat by the Northerners in the 2011 semi-final and ended a 10-year barren spell at senior level which was widely celebrated in the club.
They went on to lose to Dr Crokes of Kerry by 1–14 to 0–6 in the Munster Club semi-final on 17 November 2012.

On 15 November 2015, Commercials reached their first Munster Senior Club Championship final since 1994 after a 1–13 to 0–3 win against Milltown Malbay in the semi-final.	
On 29 November 2015, Commercials won their first Munster Senior Club title after defeating Nemo Rangers in the final in Mallow. Trailing by two points in the second minute of injury time, Michael Quinlivan scored with a low shot to the net to win the game by one point.

Honours
 Tipperary Senior Football Championship (20) 
 1944, 1948, 1956, 1965, 1966, 1967, 1969, 1971, 1982, 1986, 1989, 1990, 1994, 2002, 2012, 2015, 2017, 2019,	20202022	
 Munster Senior Club Football Championship (1) 
 2015
 South Tipperary Senior Football Championship (24) 
 1944, 1946, 1948, 1956, 1958, 1960, 1965, 1966, 1967, 1971, 1972, 1975, 1977, 1981, 1982, 1986, 1987, 1989, 1994, 2004, 2011, 2013, 2016
 Tipperary Minor Football Championship (20)
 1935, 1936, 1937, 1938, 1954, 1955, 1960, 1965, 1967, 1968, 1975, 1978, 1981, 1992, 1993, 2010, 2011, 2012, 2013, 2014
 South Tipperary Minor Football Championship (32)
 1935, 1936, 1938, 1940, 1944, 1945, 1947, 1954, 1955, 1959, 1960, 1965, 1967, 1968, 1973, 1974, 1975, 1976, 1978, 1979, 1981, 1992, 1993, 2002, 2005, 2010, 2011, 2012, 2013, 2014, 2015, 2016
 Tipperary Junior Football Championship (2)
 1940, 2007
 South Tipperary Junior Football Championship (7)
 1937, 1940, 1978, 1988, 1992, 1993, 2007
 Tipperary Junior B Football Championship (1)
 2011
 South Tipperary Junior B Football Championship (5)
 2001, 2003, 2007, 2011, 2015
 Tipperary Under-21 Football Championship (10)
 1969, 1971, 1977, 1983, 1984, 1998, 2010, 2014, 2015, 2016
 South Tipperary Under-21 Football Championship (16)
 1969, 1971, 1976, 1977, 1981, 1983, 1984, 1990, 1992, 1998, 2006, 2010, 2012, 2014, 2015, 2016

Current Panel
  Donal Lynch – Captain
 Kevin Fahey
  Kevin Harney
 Séamus Kennedy
  Jack Kennedy
 Jason Lonergan
 Michael Quinlivan – All Star Award winner 2016
 Ian Fahey
 Alan Lonergan
 Eoin Fitzgerald
 Conall Kennedy

References

External links 
 Official Site
 Tipperary GAA site

Gaelic games clubs in County Tipperary
Gaelic football clubs in County Tipperary
Clonmel